Castle Mountain is a remote 8,620-foot (2,630-meter) mountain summit located at the southeastern edge of the Wrangell Mountains, in the U.S. state of Alaska. Although modest in elevation, relief is significant as the south face rises 4,000 feet above the terminus of the Russell Glacier in less than one mile. Precipitation runoff from the peak drains east via the White River, and west to the Nizina River via Skolai Creek. The mountain's descriptive name was reported in 1914 by the United States Geological Survey.

Climate

Based on the Köppen climate classification, Castle Mountain is located in a subarctic climate zone with long, cold, snowy winters, and cool summers. Weather systems coming off the Gulf of Alaska are forced upwards by the Wrangell Mountains (orographic lift), causing heavy precipitation in the form of rainfall and snowfall. Temperatures can drop below −20 °F with wind chill factors below −30 °F. The months May through June offer the most favorable weather for viewing and climbing.

See also

Geography of Alaska
List of mountain peaks of Alaska

References

External links
 Weather forecast: Castle Mountain
 Flickr photo: Southwest aspect from Chitistone Pass

Landforms of Copper River Census Area, Alaska
Mountains of Alaska
Wrangell–St. Elias National Park and Preserve
North American 2000 m summits